Meromyza triangulina is a species of fly in the family Chloropidae, the grass flies. It is found in the  Palearctic . The larvae feed on Festuca ovina and  Festuca rubra.

References

Chloropinae
Insects described in 1960